Bangstad syndrome is a severe, inherited congenital disorder associated with abnormalities of the cell membrane.

It was characterized in 1989.

Presentation
Presenting at birth, features of the disorder include moderately severe IUGR, microcephaly, craniosynostosis, moderately severe post uterine growth retardation, deafness, deep set eyes, cryptorchidism, truncal obesity  and acanthosis nigricans, small teeth, prognathism, dislocated radial heads without generalized skeletal dysplasia, however, tall vertebrae, moderate mental retardation, hypothyroidism, insulin resistance, hypoparathyroidism.

Diagnosis

Treatment

References

External links 

Congenital disorders
Genetic disorders with OMIM but no gene
Syndromes affecting head size
Syndromes affecting hearing